The Sacred Hill is a 1913 novel by the French writer Maurice Barrès. It tells the story of three monks who turn the hill colline de Saxon-Sion in Lorraine into a place of worship, which then develops into a cult inspired by the heretic . It was translated into English with a foreword by Malcolm Cowley in 1929. 

In 1950 Le Figaro named the book as one of the winners of the "Grand Prix des meilleurs romans du demi-siècle", a prestigious literary competition to find the twelve best French novels of the first half of the twentieth century.

References

External links

 The Sacred Hill at Gallica 

1913 French novels
French-language novels
Novels by Maurice Barrès